Dmitri Igorevich Ivanov (born 6 September 2000) is a Russian football player. He plays for FC Krasnodar-2.

Club career
He made his debut in the Russian Football National League for FC Krasnodar-2 on 4 October 2020 in a game against FC Nizhny Novgorod.

References

External links
 Profile by Russian Football National League
 

2000 births
Sportspeople from Krasnodar Krai
People from Slavyansk-na-Kubani
Living people
Russian footballers
Association football defenders
FC Krasnodar-2 players
Russian First League players
Russian Second League players